Elisabeth Krumme (6 June 1897 in Bromberg (now Bydgoszcz)–11 February 1984) was a German lawyer and criminal judge at the Federal Court of Justice in Karlsruhe. Krumme was the first woman among the 30 judges in the newly created federal court.

References

1897 births
1984 deaths
People from Bydgoszcz
German women judges
20th-century German lawyers
Place of birth missing
Place of death missing
20th-century German women